Ralph Wesley Goveia Assafrao (born March 8, 1996) is a Zambian swimmer. He competed at the 2016 Summer Olympics in the men's 100 metre butterfly event; his time of 54.84 seconds in the heats did not qualify him for the semifinals.

Major Results

Individual

Long course

Note: 
1 Did not start in the final. (At the heats, he finished 8th place with 2:13.12 new national record.)
2 Did not start in the final. (At the heats, he finished 7th place with 29.32 new national record.)

Short course

Relay

Long course

Short course

References

1996 births
Living people
Zambian male breaststroke swimmers
Zambian male butterfly swimmers
Zambian male freestyle swimmers
Zambian male medley swimmers
Olympic swimmers of Zambia
Swimmers at the 2016 Summer Olympics
Commonwealth Games competitors for Zambia
Swimmers at the 2014 Commonwealth Games
Swimmers at the 2014 Summer Youth Olympics
Swimmers at the 2018 Commonwealth Games
White Zambian people
African Games competitors for Zambia
Swimmers at the 2015 African Games
Swimmers at the 2019 African Games